The East Branch Pecatonica River is a tributary of the Pecatonica River, approximately  long, in southwest Wisconsin in the United States.

See also
List of Wisconsin rivers

References

Rivers of Wisconsin
Rivers of Iowa County, Wisconsin
Rivers of Lafayette County, Wisconsin